Hack Reactor is a software engineering coding bootcamp education program founded in San Francisco by Anthony Phillips, Shawn Drost, Marcus Phillips, and Douglas Calhoun in 2012. Their coding bootcamp is currently offered in 12-week Full-Time and 9-month Part-Time formats, in-person in San Francisco, Los Angeles, New York City and Austin, as well as remotely, live online.

Cofounder Drost has described the program as, "optimized for people who want to be software engineers as their main, day-to-day work. Their life's work." The curriculum focuses on JavaScript and associated technologies including the Relational/NoSQL databases, Node.js, Express.js, jQuery, React, Redux.

In 2015 Hack Reactor acquired Austin-based MakerSquare as "their first deal in a plan to develop a network of coding bootcamps" in an effort to "make a large dent in transforming the old education system into one that focuses on student outcomes." The following month, a pair of Hack Reactor alumni partnered with the company to open Telegraph Academy "to teach software engineering to under-represented minorities" and create a "growing community of diverse software engineers." In November 2016, Hack Reactor rebranded all of its schools to share the Hack Reactor name.

Admissions process 
Hack Reactor's admissions standard has been described as "highly selective, only accepting ten to fifteen percent of applicants for each cohort." Though many applicants who do not pass the first admission interview are encouraged to try again when they feel they are better prepared.

As of 2017, Hack Reactor has two admissions paths. Students can either self-study and pass a technical interview or join their Structured Study Program, a live class which includes preparation, readiness assessment and admittance.

The technical interview tests both technical skills (JavaScript basics such as objects, arrays, functions and the ability to solve basic coding problems using JavaScript) and soft skills, such as the student’s willingness and ability to learn.

Hack Reactor has created financial partnerships with SkillsFund and Climb Credit and to assist students with paying tuition. As of 2016, WeFinance and Reactor Core (Hack Reactor's parent company) have launched a platform that allows anyone to lend to incoming students.

Course Structure 
Accepted students are assigned pre-course work, which takes "at least 50-80 hours" and is due prior to the start of their cohort.

Hack Reactor’s course is offered in 12-week full-time and 9-month part-time formats. During the first half of the program, students work in pairs on two-day “sprints.” Pair and group work helps teach communication and collaboration skills. During this part of the course, the day typically starts with a “toy problem,” which is a programming challenge designed to illustrate core concepts. This is followed by a lecture in which the instructor frequently checks in with students to assess how well they understand the material. The JavaScript tools and technologies taught at Hack Reactor include Angular, Node, MongoDB, Express, React, Backbone and ES6. The goal of this part of the course is for students to become “autonomous learners and programmers.”

The second half of the course focuses on projects. Students complete coding projects of their own design, using whatever languages and frameworks they choose. Students often adopt technologies not taught in the course using “fundamentals and self-teaching methods” taught in the first half of the course.

Student Outcomes 
Co-Founder Shawn Drost says that Hack Reactor is "committed to being the leading coding immersive in terms of quality, student experience and student outcomes." In 2017, they joined a 501(c)(6) non-profit organization called the Council on Integrity in Results Reporting (CIRR) as a founding member. CIRR requires members to report "the outcomes of every enrolled student must be reported in a single, simple, clear report" using common standards and follow "CIRR Truth in Advertising policies".

Hack Reactor Remote 
In July 2014, Hack Reactor launched an online program, Hack Reactor Remote. This program has the same curriculum, course structure and teaching method as Hack Reactor’s onsite program. Students attend and participate in the lectures at the same time as the other students, work on the same assignments, and benefit from the same job search and placement resources as the onsite program. Hack Reactor's Remote program has comparable student outcomes to its in-person campuses.

In 2017, Hack Reactor began offering a part-time version of their remote program, known as Hack Reactor Remote Part-Time.

MakerSquare Acquisition 
In January 2015, Hack Reactor acquired coding bootcamp MakerSquare, which had locations in Austin and San Francisco. MakerSquare has since expanded into Los Angeles and New York City.

MakerSquare has the same admissions process, hiring partner network, and the same curriculum with a few small modifications. In November 2016, they rebranded to share the Hack Reactor name.

Social Responsibility

Code.7370 
In collaboration with The Last Mile, Hack Reactor launched Code.7370, a coding program in San Quentin State Prison. Inmates have to apply to be a part of the program. Once accepted, they learn HTML, CSS, Python and JavaScript for 8 hours a day, 4 days a week. Hack Reactor instructors volunteered as teachers. In addition to class time students are also given time to work on personal projects. Because inmates are not permitted access to the internet, Code.7370 operates by a proprietary programming platform that simulates a normal web environment. The goal of Code.7370 is to reduce recidivism and help felons reenter the workforce.

ReBootKAMP 
Hack Reactor helped launch ReBootKAMP, a coding bootcamp in Jordan that focuses on Syrian refugees. ReBootKAMP uses Hack Reactor’s curriculum, and received volunteer assistance from Hack Reactor staff and alumni. ReBootKAMP executives also received training on coding bootcamp best practices from Hack Reactor and Reactor Core.

Hola<code/> 
In December 2017, Hack Reactor supported the launch of Hola<code/>, a coding bootcamp based in Mexico City focused on bringing new opportunities to recent returnees. Hola<code/> is powered by Hack Reactor curriculum and Hack Reactor alumni have been part of their teaching team.

See also
 Web Development
 MakerSquare

References

External links

Hack Reactor Interview Process

Computer science education
Companies based in San Francisco